Campi Salentina is a town and comune in the province of Lecce in the Apulia region of south-east Italy.

People

Carmelo Bene, an Italian author and actor
Salvatore Calabrese, an Italian physician who founded a hospital in the town
Alberto Rescio, professional football player

References

External links
Official website

Cities and towns in Apulia
Localities of Salento